Staroutkinsk is an urban locality (a work settlement) in Shalinsky District of Sverdlovsk Oblast, Russia. Population:

History
Staroutkinsk was founded in 1729. Work settlement status was granted to it in 1933.

Administrative and municipal status
Within the framework of administrative divisions, Staroutkinsk  is subordinated to Shalinsky District. As a municipal division, the work settlement of Staroutkinsk together with three rural localities in Shalinsky District is incorporated as Staroutkinsk Urban Okrug.

References

Notes

Sources

Urban-type settlements in Sverdlovsk Oblast